Hanks Anuku is a Nigerian actor. He often stars as a villain in many Nollywood films.

Life
He attended Loyola College, Ibadan. He graduated from Auchi Polytechnic in 1981. He is Igbo from Ika in Delta State. His sister was Miss Nigeria 1986 Rita Anuku, who died in 2015.

Filmography
Broad Daylight (2001)
Formidable force(2002)
Bitter Honey (2005)
The Captor (2006)
Men on Hard Way (2007)
Fools on the Run(2007) 
Desperate Ambition(2006)
My Love
Wanted Alive
Rambo
save the child the senator 1 and 2bitter honey Azubuike''

References

21st-century Nigerian male actors
Living people
1960 births
Male actors from Ibadan
Auchi Polytechnic alumni
Naturalized citizens of the United States
Nigerian male television actors
Nigerian male film actors
Igbo people
Actors from Delta State
Loyola College, Ibadan alumni